Koh Boon Hwee, DUBC (born 1950) is a Singaporean businessman.

Education
Koh was educated at Saint Andrew's School, Singapore. He went on to receive a first class honours degree in mechanical engineering from the Imperial College of Science and Technology, University of London, and an MBA (Distinction) from the Harvard Business School.

Career
Koh was appointed Chairman of the Singapore Telecom Group in 1986 and then joined the Singapore Airlines board in March 2001.

He served as Chairman of the SIA Engineering Company; a Director of Agilent Technologies Inc, [Four Soft Ltd] and Norelco UMS Holdings Limited; Executive Director of MediaRing Limited and Tech Group Asia Limited. He serves on the boards of Temasek Holdings (Private) Limited as a Director; AAC Acoustic Technologies Holdings Ltd and Infiniti Solutions Private Limited. He is also a Council Member of the Singapore Business Federation.

On 1 January 2006, Koh became chairman of DBS Bank. He joined DBS as a director on 15 June 2005. He stepped down on 30 April 2010, replaced by Peter Seah.

At the 2008 National Day Awards, Koh was awarded the Darjah Utama Bakti Cemerlang (Distinguished Service Order).

References

1950 births
Living people
DBS Bank people
Harvard Business School alumni
Saint Andrew's School, Singapore alumni
Recipients of the Darjah Utama Bakti Cemerlang
Hewlett Foundation
Singapore Business Federation